American Society of Reclamation Sciences (ASRS) (formerly the American Society of Mining and Reclamation, or ASMR) is an advisory council which focuses on the reclamation of lands that had been disturbed by coal extraction. ASRS is a professional society with international prominence, including members from 20 countries. ASRS initially focused on lands disturbed by coal mining. Today the organization focus includes all aspects of land reclamation and protection, and enhancement of soil and water resources.

See also
 National Mining Association

References

External links 

 

Coal mining in the United States
Mining organizations
Business organizations based in the United States
Environmental organizations based in the United States
Environmental organizations established in 1973
1973 establishments in the United States
Coal mining in Appalachia